The Quad Cities is a conglomerate of five cities spanning over two states in America. Spanning across 440.3 km² (170 mi²), it hosts many buildings and this is a list of the tallest buildings in the Quad Cities area. 

Currently, the tallest building in the Quad cities is the Davenport Bank and Trust, reaching 78m high with seventeen floors.

References 

Quad Cities

Tallest in Quad
Tallest in Quad